Maria Deku  (18 March 1901 in Düsseldorf – 19 April 1983 in Kleinblittersdorf) was a German politician, representative of the Christian Social Union of Bavaria.
 
Between December 1946 and February 1948 she was a member of the Landtag of Bavaria.

See also
List of Bavarian Christian Social Union politicians

Christian Social Union in Bavaria politicians
1901 births
1983 deaths